The Colombian Declaration of Independence occurred on July 20, 1810 when the Junta de Santa Fe was formed in Santa Fe de Bogota, the capital of the Spanish colonial Viceroyalty of New Granada, to govern the territory autonomously from Spain. The event inspired similar independence movements across Latin America, and triggered an almost decade-long rebellion culminating in the founding of the Republic of Gran Colombia, which spanned present-day Colombia, mainland Ecuador, Panama, and Venezuela, along with parts of northern Peru and northwestern Brazil. 

Although Gran Colombia would ultimately dissolve in 1831, it was for a time among the most powerful countries in the Western Hemisphere, and played an influential role in shaping the political development of other newly sovereign Latin American states. The modern nation-state of Colombia recognizes the event as its national independence day.

Political background 

Spain was ruled by a typical enlightened absolutist monarch, promoting culture and Christianity, and allowing some expression of the ideas of the Age of Enlightenment, in the country and its colonies, while at the same time maintaining strong political control.  However, the Spanish colonies in the Americas were forbidden to trade with other countries and their colonies, such as Great Britain and British North America, and the French Empire and New France. Spain was their only source of goods and merchandise, although it was unable to fulfill the trade demands of its colonies. Furthermore, Charles III's support for the independence of the United States generated new taxes, causing unrest in Spain's colonies in the Americas, such as the Revolt of the Comuneros (New Granada) and the Rebellion of Túpac Amaru II. Another major tension was the policy of excluding Criollos, or locally born whites, from public administration.

Charles IV (reigned 1788–1808) was not very interested in exercising political power, leaving such duties to his ministers, specially the disliked Manuel Godoy. Charles IV was more interested in pursuing the arts and science and gave little importance to the American colonies.

The development that precipitated the events of July 20, 1810, was the crisis of the Spanish monarchy caused by the 1808 abdications of Charles IV and Ferdinand VII forced by Napoleon Bonaparte in favor of his brother Joseph Bonaparte. The ascension of King Joseph initially had been cheered by Spanish afrancesados (literally, "Frenchified"), usually elites and important statesmen who believed that collaboration with France would bring modernization and liberty to Spain. An example of Joseph's policies was the abolition of the Spanish Inquisition. However, the general population rejected the new king and opposition, led by the priesthood and patriots, became widespread after the French army's first examples of repression (such as the executions of May 3, 1808, in Madrid) became widely known.
 
Eventually an emergency government in the form of a Supreme Central Junta was formed in Spain. Most of the authorities in the Americas swore allegiance to the new Supreme Central Junta.

Memorandum of Offences

The Supreme Central Junta ordered the election of one representative from each of the main cities of the Spanish American viceroyalties by their cabildos (municipal governments). These included primary cities in the Viceroyalty of New Spain, Viceroyalty of Perú, Viceroyalty of New Granada, and Viceroyalty of the Río de la Plata, and the Captaincy General of Cuba, Captaincy General of Puerto Rico, Captaincy General of Guatemala, Captaincy General of Chile, Captaincy General of Venezuela, and the Spanish East Indies. In addition the cabildos were to draft instructions for the representative to present to the Supreme Central Junta.

The Memorandum of Offenses (or Memorandum of Grievances) was drafted by Camilo Torres Tenor in his capacity as legal advisor to the Santa Fe de Bogotá cabildo. In it he criticized the Spanish Monarchy's policy of excluding Criollos from high posts in the Americas and alleging their rights to govern in their homelands as "the offspring of the conquistadores". Furthermore, he proposed equality between Spanish Americans and Spaniards as the basis for maintaining the unity of the Spanish Monarchy:
"[There are no] other means to consolidate the union between America and Spain [but] the just and competent representation of its people, without any difference among its subjects that they do not have because of their laws, their customs, their origins, and their rights. Equality! The sacred right of equality. Justice is founded upon that principle and upon granting everyone that which is his. […] [T]he true fraternal union between European Spaniards and Americans… can never exist except upon the basis of justice and equality. America and Spain are two integral and constituent parts of the Spanish Monarchy… Anyone who believes otherwise does not love his patria… Therefore, to exclude the Americans from such representation, in addition to being the greatest injustice, would arouse distrust and jealousy, and would forever alienate their desires for such a union…"

Torres defended the right of the Viceroyalty of New Granada to establish a junta given the political circumstances. Although the draft expressed many of common sentiments of Criollos at the time and probably was discussed by prominent members of the capital's society, it was never adopted by the cabildo. It would be published for the first time only in 1832.

The First Juntas
As the military situation in Spain deteriorated, many Spanish Americans desired to establish their own juntas, despite their formal declarations of loyalty to the Supreme Central Junta. A movement to set up a junta in neighboring Caracas in 1808 was stopped by the Captain-General with arrests of the conspirators. In the Royal Audiencia of Charcas (present day Bolivia) juntas were established in Charcas (May 25) and La Paz (July 1809).

More importantly to events in New Granada, in the neighboring Royal Audiencia of Quito—a territory under the auspices of the Viceroy of New Granada— a group of Criollos led by Juan Pío Montúfar, the second Marquis of Selva Alegre, established the autonomous junta Luz de América on August 10, swearing loyalty to Ferdinand VII, but rejecting the viceregal authorities. Viceroy Antonio José Amar y Borbón considered this a rebellious act, and fearing for similar developments in New Granada, ordered military action to put down the junta in conjunction with the Viceroy of Peru.

Dissolution of the Supreme Central Junta

In mid-1810 news arrived that the Supreme Central Junta had dissolved itself in favor of a regency. In response to the new political crisis, Spaniards and Criollos in the Americas established juntas that continued to swear allegiance to King Ferdinand VII.

The next incident happened in Caracas, on April 19, 1810.  The mantuanos, (the rich, criollo elite of colonial Venezuela) together with military and eclessiatic authorities, declared autonomy, again swearing loyalty to Ferdinand VII, but rejecting the viceroyalty.  The Cadiz Board of government decided to order the destitution of Amar y Borbon, sending a notification with the royal visitor Antonio Villavicencio, who arrived in Cartagena on May 8.

On May 22 in Cartagena de Indias, the Cartagena Board of government was created with similar terms to the previous one. Shortly after, similar actions against the Viceroy broke out in Santiago de Cali, Socorro and Pamplona.  Finally, Bogota, the central cathedra of the Viceroyalty rebelled on July 20. Initially, the government board declared to Amar y Borbón as president, but shortly after, on July 25, he was deposed and arrested. The spark for this was the flower vase incident at local businessman José González Llorente's Bogota residence on the morning of the 20th.

Flower vase incident
On the morning of July 20, 1810, Joaquin Camacho went to the residence of the Viceroy Antonio José Amar y Borbón, requesting response on an application for the establishment of a governing board in Bogota, the viceregal capital, in similar lines to those already established in other cities. The refusal of the Viceroy to grant the request, coupled with his arrogance, made to proceed to join the fray with the excuse of the loan of a vase. 

Luis Rubio then went to visit the businessman José González Llorente to borrow the vase, to use it in a dinner for the visiting royal commissioner Antonio Villavicencio, but Llorente refused to lend the vase with a haughty attitude. In light of this, and as was planned on the previous day, the "criollos" took the vase and broke it to provoke Llorente and thus raised tempers of the people against the Spanish. The "criollos" knew Llorente, being a merchant, would refuse to lend the vase, first because it was for sale and second because he would not lend any objects to the "criollos" to meet fellow "criollos". 

Subsequently, a group of Venezuelans, among whom was Francisco José de Caldas, made an oath of submission to Spain and the Regency Council. In response, Antonio Morales Caldas scolded him for prompting a turbulent response from the people, who tried to attack Llorente. The mayor of Santa Fe de Bogota, José Miguel Pey, tried to calm the people attacking Llorente, while Jose Maria Carbonell encouraged people to join the protest. That afternoon, a Junta was formed (later called the People's Junta) with José Acevedo as chairman, but the crowds were angered by the Viceroy's decision to be nominated for president, which he accepted. Among the shocked crowds were members of the local militia battalion commanded by Antonio Baraya.

Junta and Seville Regency Council
Later, a rally called by Juan Sámano, a Spanish Army officer, would lead to the Junta being reorganized (Acevedo had earlier urged the people to help charge him for lèse-majesté). The next day, July 21, the Junta ordered the arrest of Viceroy Aman y Borbón and his officials, and also for his resignation from the Junta presidency. On the 25th Aman was forced to resign and was arrested. Five days later, July 26, the Junta declared that its ties to the Seville Regency Council were finally cut, therefore the Junta officially declared the independence of what is now Colombia from Spanish rule and the rule of the Regency Council. Bogota would be the first city of the colony to break its ties with Spain, followed by more provincial capitals in the coming months.

See also 

 
 Junta (Spanish American Independence)
 Public holidays in Colombia
 Republic of Gran Colombia
 Spanish colonization of the Americas

Notes

References

External links
 

Colonial Colombia
Independence of Colombia
Declarations of independence
Viceroyalty of New Granada
1810 in international relations
1810 in Colombia
1810 in the Viceroyalty of New Granada
Colonial Venezuela
Gran Colombia
History of Colombia
Separatism in Colombia
July 1810 events